The Scout and Guide movement in Vietnam is served by
 The Vietnamese Girl Scout Association, former member of the World Association of Girl Guides and Girl Scouts
 The Vietnamese Scout Association, former member of the World Organization of the Scout Movement
 Pathfinder Scouts Vietnam, member of World Organization of the Scout Movement since 2019
Vietnamese Scouting comes under the World Organization of the Scout Movement's Asia-Pacific Region. 
In 2010, the World Organization of the Scout Movement started new training courses for a fresh generation of Scout leaders for Vietnam.
Vietnamese Scout Leaders take part in training events at the movements regional centre, Mount Makiling in the Philippines.

References

See also

Ho Chi Minh Young Pioneer Organization